Haim Yosef David Azulai ben Yitzhak Zerachia (1724 – 1 March 1806), commonly known as the Hida (the acronym of his name), was a Jerusalem born rabbinical scholar, a noted bibliophile, and a pioneer in the publication of Jewish religious writings.

Some have speculated that his family name, Azulai, is an acronym based on being a Kohen:  (Leviticus, 21:7), a biblical restriction on whom a Kohen may marry.

Biography 
Azulai was born in Jerusalem, where he received his education from some local prominent scholars. He was the scion of a prominent rabbinic family, the great-great-grandson of Moroccan Rabbi Abraham Azulai. The Yosef part of his name came from his mother's father, Rabbi Yosef Bialer, a German scholar.

His main teachers were the Yishuv haYashan rabbis Isaac HaKohen Rapoport, Shalom Sharabi, and Haim ibn Attar (the Ohr HaHaim) as well as Jonah Nabon. At an early age he showed proficiency in Talmud, Kabbalah, and Jewish history, and "by the age of 12 he was already composing chiddushim on Hilchos Melichah."

In 1755, he was—on the basis of his scholarship—elected to become an emissary (shaliach) for the small Jewish community in the Land of Israel, and he would travel around Europe extensively, making an impression in every Jewish community that he visited. According to some records, he left the Land of Israel three times (1755, 1770, and 1781), living in Hebron in the meantime. His travels took him to Western Europe, North Africa, and—according to legend—to Lithuania, where he met the Vilna Gaon.

In 1755 he was in Germany, where he met the Pnei Yehoshua,
 who on the basis of prior written communication confirmed Hida's identity.  In 1764 he was in Egypt, and in 1773 he was in Tunisia, Morocco, and Italy. He seems to have remained in the latter country until 1777, most probably occupied with the printing of the first part of his biographical dictionary, Shem HaGedolim, (Livorno, 1774), and with his notes on the Shulhan Aruch, entitled Birke Yosef, (Livorno, 1774–76). In 1777 he was in France, and in 1778 in Holland. Wherever he went, he would examine collections of manuscripts of rabbinic literature, which he later documented in his Shem HaGedolim.

On 28 October 1778 he married, in Pisa, his second wife, Rachel; his first wife, also Rachel, had died in 1773. Noting this event in his diary, he adds the wish that he may be permitted to return to the Land of Israel. This wish seems not to have been realized. In any event, he remained in Leghorn (Livorno), occupied with the publication of his works, and died there twenty-eight years later in 1806 (Friday night, 11 Adar 5566, Shabbat Zachor). He had been married twice; he had two sons by the names of Abraham and Raphael Isaiah Azulai.

Reburial in Israel
In 1956, the 150th anniversary of Hida's death, Israel's Chief Rabbi Yitzhak Nissim 
began work on a plan to reinter Hida in Israel. This included getting the approval and cooperation of the Leghorn Jewish community, acquiring a special 600 square meter plot on Har Hamenuchot, and constructing an ohel over the grave. On Tuesday, 20 Iyar 5720 (17 May 1960), 154 years after his Petira, Hida's final written wish, to return to Israel, "came true."

His early scholarship 
While being a strict Talmudist, and a believer in the Kabbalah, his studious habits and exceptional memory awakened in him an interest in the history of rabbinical literature.

He accordingly began at an early age a compilation of passages in rabbinical literature in which dialectic authors had tried to solve questions that were based on chronological errors. This compilation, which he completed at age 16, he called העלם דבר (Some Oversights); it was never printed.

Azulai's scholarship made him so famous that in 1755 he was chosen as meshulach, (emissary), an honor bestowed on such men only as were, by their learning, well fitted to represent the Holy Land in Europe, where the people looked upon a rabbi from the land of Israel as a model of learning and piety.

Azulai's literary activity is of an astonishing breadth. It encompasses every area of rabbinic literature: exegesis, homiletics, casuistry, Kabbalah, liturgics, and literary history. A voracious reader, he noted all historical references; and on his travels he visited the famous libraries of Italy and France, where he examined the Hebrew manuscripts.

His works 
Azulai was a prolific writer. His works range from a prayerbook he edited and arranged ('Tefillat Yesharim') to a vast spectrum of Halachic literature including a commentary on the Shulchan Aruch titled 'Birkei Yosef' which appears in most editions. While living and traveling in Italy, he printed many works, mainly in Livorno and Pisa but also in Mantua. The list of his works, compiled by Isaac ben Jacob, runs to seventy-one items; but some are named twice, because they have two titles, and some are only small treatises. The veneration bestowed upon him by his contemporaries was that given to a saint. He reports in his diary that when he learned in Tunis of the death of his first wife, he kept it secret, because the people would have forced him to marry at once. Legends printed in the appendix to his diary, and others found in Aaron Walden's Shem HaGedolim HeḤadash (compare also Ma'aseh Nora, pp. 7–16, Podgorica, 1899), prove the great respect in which he was held. Many of his works are still extant and studied today. His scope was exceptionally wide, from halakha (Birkei Yosef) and Midrash to his main historical work Shem HaGedolim. Despite his Sephardi heritage, he appears to have been particularly fond of the Chasidei Ashkenaz (a group of Medieval German rabbis, notably Judah the Chasid).

Shem HaGedolim 
His notes were published in four booklets, comprising two sections, under the titles Shem HaGedolim (The Name of the Great Ones), containing the names of authors, and Va'ad la-Ḥakhamim (Assembly of the Wise), containing the titles of works. This treatise has established for Azulai a lasting place in Jewish literature. It contains data that might otherwise have been lost, and it proves the author to have had a critical mind. By sound scientific methods he investigated the question of the genuineness of Rashi's commentary to Chronicles or to some Talmudic treatise (see "Rashi," in Shem HaGedolim). However, he does assert that Rashi indeed is the author of the "Rashi" commentary on Neviim and Ketuvim, contrary to others' opinions.

Nevertheless, he firmly believed that Haim Vital had drunk water from Miriam's well, and that this fact enabled him to receive, in less than two years, the whole Kabbalah from the lips of Isaac Luria (see "Ḥayyim Vital," in Shem HaGedolim). Azulai often records where he has seen in person which versions of certain manuscripts were extant.

Bibliography 
A complete bibliographical list of his works is found in the preface to Benjacob's edition of Shem HaGedolim, Vilna, 1852, and frequently reprinted;
 Eliakim Carmoly, in the edition of Shem HaGedolim, Frankfort-on-the-Main, 1843;
 Fuenn, Keneset Yisrael, p. 342;
 Hazan, Hama'alot li-Shelomoh, Alexandria, 1894;
 Aaron Walden, Shem HaGedolim HeChadash, 1879;
 The diary Ma'agal Tob, edited by Elijah Benamozegh, Leghorn, 1879;
 Heimann Joseph Michael, Or ha-chayyim, No. 868.

His role as Shadar 

The Hida's role as shadar (shaliach derabanan), or emissary, and major Jewish traveler of his day is a little-known or appreciated aspect of his life. He left Israel twice on five-year-long fundraising missions that took him as far west as Tunisia and as far north as Great Britain and Amsterdam. His mission: Raise money for the support and survival of the beleaguered Jewish community of Hebron. At that time, the Jewish community of Hebron, as well as other communities in Israel, suffered the brutal and constant privations of Arab and Turkish landlords and warlords who demanded exorbitant sums of money in the form of arbitrary and draconian taxes. Moreover, money and work in that part of the world were very hard to come by. Without the missions of people like the Hida, the very physical survival of these communities came into question.

Yet the task of raising the necessary funds was much more complicated than most people realize. The right candidate for the mission, ideally, combined the characteristics of statesmanship, physical strength and endurance, Torah knowledge and understanding and the ability to speak multiple languages. They had to have the right stature and bearing to impress the Jewish communities they visited, they often had to be able to arbitrate matters of Jewish law for the locals and, ideally, they were multi-lingual so that they could communicate with both Jew and Gentile along the way. Finally, they had to be willing to undertake the dangerous, time-consuming mission that would take them away from their families for so long. At that time, travel was far more time-consuming and much more dangerous than it is today, especially for Jews. One in ten emissaries sent abroad for these fund raising missions never made it back alive. Emissaries would often divorce their wives before leaving, so that if they died along the way and their deaths could not be verified, their wives would be able to legally remarry. If they returned safely from their journey, they would remarry their wives, who would sometimes wait as long as five years for their husbands to return from their mission.

Moreover, the Hida records numerous instances of miraculous survival and dangerous threats of his day, among them, close scrapes with the Russian Navy during its support of the Ali Bey uprising against the Turks, the danger of boarding and worse by the Knights of Malta, the possible anger of English government officials towards anyone entering the country from France or Spain, as well as those aforementioned countries' wrath against someone crossing back over from their hated enemy, England, and the daily danger of running into various anti-semitic locals and nobles throughout mainland Europe (especially Germany).

No discussion of the Hida's bravery and accomplishment during his fund raising missions is complete without mentioning his intact and published travel diaries, which places him in the ranks of Benjamin of Tudela in terms of providing a comprehensive first hand account of Jewish life and historical events throughout the Europe and Near East of his day.

References 

 
 Biography of Rabbi Azulai - A Legend of Greatness - The Life & Time of Hacham Haim Yosef David Azoulay by Yehuda Azoulay

External links 

 Short biography of Rabbi Haim Yosef David Azulai

Kabbalists
1724 births
1806 deaths
18th-century rabbis in Jerusalem
19th-century Italian rabbis
Sephardi rabbis in Ottoman Palestine
18th-century Sephardi Jews
19th-century Sephardi Jews
Bibliographers of Hebrew literature
Jewish explorers
Jewish Israeli writers
Bibliophiles
Burials at Har HaMenuchot
Authors of books on Jewish law